Godstar is the name of a song and several releases by Psychic TV in 1985. The releases feature the band The Angels of Light. Two compilations, Godstar: Thee Director's Cut and Godstar: The Singles - Pt. 2, were later released. The song was about the life of Rolling Stones founder Brian Jones.
The song was covered by Television Personalities on their album Don't Cry Baby, It's Only A Movie.

Catalogue numbers
12" vinyl: TOPYH 009
12" vinyl picture disc: TOPIC 009
7" vinyl: TOPY 009
2x7" vinyl: TOPYS 009

Album notes
"Godstar" was advertised as the theme song for the forthcoming feature film of the same name about the Life of Brian Jones. The mentioned film has not been released since, and is unlikely to exist.

Track listing

12" vinyl and 12" vinyl picture disc
Side A
"Godstar (Hyperdelic Mix)"
Side B
"Godstar (California Mix)"

7" vinyl
Side A
"Godstar"
Side B
"Godstar (B.J. Mix)"

2x7" vinyl
Side A
"Godstar"
Side B
"Godstar (BJ Mix)"
Side C
"Discopravity (Fish Mix)"
Side D
"Yes It's The B Side"

Charts

References

1985 singles
Psychic TV songs
1985 songs
UK Independent Singles Chart number-one singles
Songs about musicians